The 2019 Central African Republic League season is the top level of football competition in Central African Republic.

Teams
A total of 8 teams participate in the Ligue de Bangui Division 1:
Anges de Fatima
AS Tempête Mocaf
Castel Foot
DFC8
FCFDS
Olympic Real de Bangui
SCAF
USCA

The champions are AS Tempête Mocaf.

References

External links
Ligue de Football de Bangui Division 1 & Division 2

Football leagues in the Central African Republic
League
Central African Republic